James Bowron (November 16, 1844 - August 26, 1928) was chairman of the board of the Gulf States Steel Corporation.

Biography
He was born in England on November 16, 1844. He  married Ada Louisa Barrett on June 20, 1870. He and his father migrated to South Pittsburg, Tennessee around 1875. They started a small iron manufacturing business. In 1882 the Tennessee Coal, Iron, and Railroad Company purchased their company and Bowron became the treasurer of the merged company.

He died of August 26, 1928 in Birmingham, Alabama.

External links
James Bowron papers, University Libraries Division of Special Collections, The University of Alabama.

References

1844 births
1928 deaths
English emigrants to the United States
Place of birth missing
American steel industry businesspeople
People from South Pittsburg, Tennessee